Anolis poecilopus, the dappled anole, is a species of lizard in the family Dactyloidae. The species is found in Panama and Colombia.

References

Anoles
Reptiles of Colombia
Reptiles of Panama
Reptiles described in 1862
Taxa named by Edward Drinker Cope